Samson and Delilah is a German/Italian/American television film that was first shown on TNT in the United States. It was directed by Nicolas Roeg and broadcast December 8, 1996.

Plot 
Samson is chosen by God to destroy the Philistines, who have occupied the land of Canaan. He is given the greatest strength ever known to man as long as he remains true to his vow and its conditions, yet he still is not convinced of his purpose, preferring instead to spend his time with Philistine company.  He eventually falls in love with a Philistine girl, decides to marry her, but is betrayed by her on his wedding day. He soon learns she was blackmailed by the Philistine lords who are plotting his demise, and goes to reclaim her, but she has been murdered along with her entire family.

Meanwhile, a treacherous courtesan of the king, Delilah, is convinced of her ability to bring even the mighty Samson to his knees. She appeals to Samson as a beautiful woman, and Samson is immediately taken with her. They begin the relationship of two passionate lovers, and Delilah convinces Samson of her love, ultimately seducing him into telling her the secret of his strength.
Samson is thus at last captured by the Philistines, who blind him and make him into a slave, forcing him to grind grain at a millstone. At the celebration of his and his kingdom's defeat, he is brought in chains to be both an example and entertainment to his captors. Unbeknownst to them, his strength has returned, and as he stands between the two pillars that support the building, he asks God for forgiveness. He then pushes against the pillars, collapsing the building and killing those inside, including himself. Delilah, who was present in the temple, also dies as well. As often in film and movies Delilah is portrayed as weak and unwise but not evil and apparently genuinely in love with Samson.

Cast

Eric Thal as Samson
Jonathan Rhys Meyers as Young Samson
Elizabeth Hurley as Delilah
Dennis Hopper as General Tariq
Diana Rigg as Mara
Michael Gambon as King Hanun
Daniel Massey as Ira
Paul Freeman as  Manoah
Ben Becker as Prince Sidqa
Jale Arıkan as Naomi
Pinkas Braun as Harach
Alessandro Gassman as Amrok
Debora Caprioglio as Rani
Sebastian Knapp as Yoram
Matt Green as Elder Yoram
Karl Tessler as Jehiel
Leo Gregory as Young Jehiel
Luke Mullaney as Amran
Tobias Saunders as Young Amran
Tim Gallagher as Habor
Mark McGann as Mahal
Luke de Lacey as Philistine Soldier
John Forbes-Robertson as Philistine Doctor
Mary Hanefey as Delilah's Servant
Neil Robinson as Yoram as Narrator

Production 
The film was entirely shot in Ouarzazate, Morocco from early March and late June 1996. The Italian actor Giorgio Francesco Palombi was one of the film's stunt performers. He later appeared in TNT's biblical television film David as Goliath of Gath. A male African lion named Sudan was trained by Hubert G. Wells, Sled Reynolds and Victoria Vopni. In addition, English mechatronic engineers from Jim Henson's Creature Shop provided an animatronic lion for the animal's attack scene.

References

External links
 

1996 films
1996 television films
American television films
German television films
Das Erste original programming
Italian television films
Films about Samson
Films directed by Nicolas Roeg
Bible Collection
Films shot in Morocco